Tuhala is a village in Kose Parish, Harju County in northern Estonia. As of 2011 Census, the settlement's population was 105. It is believed that settlement in Tuhala dates back around 3,000 years.

Tuhala Karst Area, named after the village, lies for the most part in neighbouring Kata village. It has Estonia's largest area of porous karst, with several underground rivers and sinkholes. The karst area is best known for its Witch's Well (also in Kata).

Tuhala Manor
Tuhala Manor was first mentioned in 1468 as Toall. During times it belonged to several Baltic German families: Tödwen (1468–1517); Delwig (1517 – mid-16th century); Ulrich (?–1663); Wrangell (1663–1693); Mellin (1692–1863); Lilienfeld (1863–1919). Famous cartographer Ludwig August Mellin, was born in the manor. The last main building had two storeys and was built ca. 1800. The Early-classical appearance was changed to more Neoclassical in the 1880s. The manor was burned down during the Revolution of 1905, along with more than 150 manors in Estonia. It was never restored; nowadays only few segments of walls have remained. Some of the outbuildings have preserved.

Notable people
Ludwig August Mellin (1754–1835), Baltic German politician, cartographer, writer and publicist, was born in Tuhala Manor.
Hjalmar Mäe (1901–1978), Estonian politician, was born in Tuhala.

References

External links

Villages in Harju County
Kreis Harrien